The Wild Pair is a 1987 action comedy film directed by Beau Bridges and starring Bridges, Bubba Smith and Lloyd Bridges.

Cast
Beau Bridges as Joe Jennings
Bubba Smith as Benny Avalon
Lloyd Bridges as Col. Heser
Gary Lockwood as Capt. Kramer
Raymond St. Jacques as Ivory
Danny De La Paz as Tucker
Lela Rochon as Debby
Ellen Geer as Fern Willis

Reception
Leonard Maltin awarded the film one and a half stars.

References

External links
 
 

American action comedy films
Films scored by Michel Colombier
Films scored by John Debney
1980s English-language films
1980s American films